Kroppefjälls IF is a Swedish football club located in Dals Rostock.

External links
Official site 

Football clubs in Västra Götaland County